Seven ships of the Royal Navy have been named HMS Solebay after the battle of Solebay on 7 June 1672, the first battle of the Third Anglo-Dutch War.

  was a 24-gun sixth rate launched in 1694. She was wrecked in 1709 on Boston Rock, Lyme Regis.
  was a 24-gun sixth rate launched in 1711. She was converted to a 6-gun bomb vessel in 1726, an 8-gun fireship in 1734 and a 20-gun sixth rate in 1735. She became a guard ship in 1736, a hospital ship in 1742 and was sold in 1748.
  was a 20-gun sixth rate launched in 1742. She was captured by the French in 1744, recaptured by the British in 1746 and was sold into mercantile service in 1763.
  was a 28-gun  sixth rate launched in 1763. She was wrecked in 1782.
  was a 32-gun fifth rate launched in 1785 and wrecked in 1809.
Iris was renamed Solebay in 1809, converted to a receiving ship in 1811, lent to the Marine Society in 1815 and broken up in 1833.
She was laid down in 1942, but renamed  later that year.
  was a  launched in 1944 and broken up in 1967.

Royal Navy ship names